John Buckman Walthour (August 24, 1904 – October 29, 1952) was the 4th bishop of the Episcopal Diocese of Atlanta in the United States.

Background
He was born 24 August 1904 in Cape May, New Jersey, the son of Harry Clayton and Helen Millward Walthour.  Frederick F. Reese, the Bishop of Georgia ordained Walthour as deacon and priest in 1931. On 21 October 1931 he married Margaret Simkins Baker.

He was called to Grace Church in Waycross, Georgia, remaining there only briefly before being called to St. Andrew's Church in Tampa, Florida.  From 1941 to 1947, he served as chaplain at United States Military Academy, West Point. In 1947, Walthour was called to be Dean of the Cathedral of St. Philip in Atlanta, Georgia.

He was consecrated Bishop in 1952 and died within his first year.

Consecrators
 Henry Knox Sherrill, 20th Presiding Bishop of the Episcopal Church USA
 Edwin A. Penick
 Oliver J. Hart
John Walthour was the 511th bishop consecrated in the Episcopal Church.

See also
 Episcopal Diocese of Atlanta
 List of Bishop Succession in the Episcopal Church

References
 Diocesan Centennial Website Bishop Walthour page. Accessed: 1 March 2006
 The Episcopal Church Annual. Morehouse Publishing: New York, NY (2005).

1904 births
1952 deaths
People from Cape May, New Jersey
Episcopal bishops of Atlanta
American military chaplains
United States Military Academy faculty
World War II chaplains
20th-century American Episcopalians
20th-century American clergy